The Darkened Valley is a piece for piano solo composed in 1920 by John Ireland.

A performance takes about 3½ minutes.

References 

Solo piano pieces by John Ireland
1920 compositions